"I Should've Followed You Home" is a duet sung by Swedish recording artist and ABBA member Agnetha Fältskog and British singer-songwriter and Take That frontman Gary Barlow. Written by Barlow and producer Jörgen Elofsson, it was the third single taken from A.

Background 
"I Should've Followed You Home" was co-written by Gary Barlow and Jorgen Elofsson. Elofsson was looking for the ideal duet partner to match Agnetha for the album and was delighted to get his first choice: "To me Gary Barlow was the perfect partner," he explained. "His warm and thick voice matched perfectly with Agnetha's pop soprano voice. I must say I was nervous when I presented my favourite choice but luckily for me one of Agnetha's favourite songs turned out to be "Back for Good" by Take That!"

Barlow and Elofsson had worked together in the past and recorded the song first with Barlow's vocals. Fältskog loved the track and was delighted to turn it into a duet, feeling that the two voices together were a fantastic combination. Their recording sessions happened separately so the pair did not finally meet in person until she visited London in May and the two met for the BBC documentary Agnetha: ABBA and After... which was broadcast in June.

On 12 November 2013 Fältskog sang live "I Should've Followed You Home" at the BBC Children in Need Rocks 2013 concert in London. She sang the song with Gary Barlow, the organiser of the event, this being her first live performance for 25 years.

Promotional video

Formats and track listing

Chart performance

References 

2013 singles
Agnetha Fältskog songs
Songs written by Gary Barlow
Songs written by Jörgen Elofsson
2013 songs
Universal Music Group singles